Sarah Wilhelmy (born 2 February 1980) is a British former sprinter. She won a bronze medal in the 200 metres at the 1998 IAAF World Junior Championships and represented Great Britain in the 4 x 100 metres relay at the 2000 Sydney Olympics.

Early life
Born in Stepney, Greater London, Wilhelmy attended Southend High School for Girls, which is a grammar school with academy status, situated on Southchurch Boulevard in the east of Southend-on-Sea England.

Career
Wilhelmy won the English Schools Under 15 Long jump title in 1993, with a jump of 5.70 metres, and went on to win the 200 metres at the English Schools in 1994 (U15) and 1996 (U17). She also won four AAAs junior titles: 60 metres indoors (U15 1994), (U17 1995) and 200 metres (U15 1994), (U20 1997). The highlight of her junior career was winning a bronze medal in the 200m at the 1998 World Junior Championships, in a race won by France's Muriel Hurtis.

In 2000, she won the AAAs Championship 200m title, but failed to gain Olympic selection in that event as she didn't have the qualifying standard. She did however earn Olympic selection as part of the 4 × 100 m relay squad. At the Olympic Games in Sydney, she ran in the first round heats before being replaced by Sam Davies for the semifinals. Wilhelmy won the AAAs Championship 100m title in 2001. At the 2001 World Championships in Athletics, she ran the second leg of the British 4 × 100 m team that finished fifth in the final in 42.60 seconds.

International competitions

References

1980 births
Living people
English female sprinters
Athletes (track and field) at the 2000 Summer Olympics
Olympic athletes of Great Britain
People educated at Southend High School for Girls
Olympic female sprinters